Dream Children, Op 43 is a musical work for small orchestra by Edward Elgar. There are two movements:

1. Andante in G minor 
2. Allegretto piacevole in G major

History 
These two pieces were written in 1902, when Elgar was approaching the peak of his fame and popularity. Unusually for Elgar they were not written to any commission. Michael Kennedy suggests that they may have been retrieved from the unused material for a symphony celebrating General Gordon which Elgar had been working on since 1898. They are not complete symphonic movements (the first movement takes a little over three minutes to perform and the second a little over four minutes) but it was Elgar's practice to work in small sections and then put them together into a whole.

Ernest Newman described Dream Children as "a couple of delicate little pastels for a small orchestra, inspired by an essay of Charles Lamb. Elia (sc. Lamb), entertaining some children with stories of their grandmother, finds them gradually disappear from his sight he is, indeed, only dreaming":

Newman continues, "The two pieces are very short – 24 and 141 bars respectively. The first, a tender little reverie with much lovely feeling underlying its simplicity, is the better of the two. The second, though charming, is more obvious in its sentiment. At the end of it there is a return to the theme of the first".

The orchestral score and parts were originally published by Joseph Williams Ltd (London) in 1902, and then in 1911 by Schott & Co with the title Enfants d'un Rêve and the translation below this "(Dream-Children)". As with his earlier piece Salut d'Amour, Elgar agreed with the same publisher that the French title would sell better.

The first performance was at the Queen's Hall on 4 September 1902, conducted by Arthur W Payne.

Instrumentation 
2 flutes, 2 oboes, 2 clarinets in B and A, 2 bassoons, 4 horns in F, 3 timpani, harp and strings.

References

Sources

External links

Compositions by Edward Elgar
1902 compositions